is a Japanese tarento and actress. She is the former captain of idol group Sakurazaka46, represented by Sony Music Records. She is also the former Special Ambassador for the Japan Equestrian Federation.

Career

Sakurazaka46 
On August 21, 2015, Sugai along with 22 other members were announced for the newly created idol group, Toriizaka46, renamed shortly after into Keyakizaka46 and again into Sakurazaka46 in 2020.

Sugai made her musical debut with Keyakizaka46's first single, Silent Majority. As of February 2019, she has participated in all eight of Keyakizaka46's singles. She is also part of the subgroup  along with Risa Watanabe, Akane Moriya, Manaka Shida, and Rika Watanabe. As part of the subunit, Sugai made center appearances in three songs: "Aozora Chigau" in "Sekai ni wa Ai Shika Nai", "Wareta Sumaho" in "Fukyōwaon, and "Namiuchigiwa o Hashiranai ka?" in "Kaze ni Fukarete mo". Additionally, Sugai made two song appearances as part of Sakamichi AKB (坂道AKB), a group made of various AKB48 and Sakamichi members. She will also be included in Sakamichi AKB's next song.

During a handshake event on January 21, 2017, Sugai was named the captain of Keyakizaka46. Akane Moriya was named co-captain on the same day.

On April 11, 2018, Kodansha announced that they will be publishing a photo-book featuring Sugai that was photographed in Paris. She became the fourth member in Keyakizaka46 to have a photobook, behind Neru Nagahama, Yui Imaizumi, and Rika Watanabe. The photo-book, titled Fiancé (フィアンセ), was the bestselling photo-book in Japan for three weeks in a row.

On August 22, 2022, Sugai announced that she will be leaving Sakurazaka46 after the Tokyo Dome performances on November 8 and 9, the final leg of the national tour that will begin in September that year. Second generation member Rina Matsuda succeeded her as captain.

Equestrianism 
Sugai started horseback riding in 5th grade. She has won numerous awards in various junior national competitions, particularly in dressage. She often discusses horse riding in her appearances with Sakurazaka46, which contributes to her established persona in the group.

She left the position in the end of 2021.

Awards 
The table below lists Sugai's top three finishes in equestrian competitions recognized by the Japan Equestrian Federation.

Post-Sakurazaka46 
On November 24, 2022, Sugai opened a Twitter account.

Her first post-Sakurazaka46 activity was an acting role in the stage play Neo Bakumatsu Junjoden, which ran from January 28 to February 19, 2023.

On February 12, 2023, Sugai's official website was launched. On the same day, she was announced as a host for the horseback racing program Keiba Beat .

Personal life
Sugai was born on November 29, 1995, in Tokyo, Japan. As a child, she had 11 years of ballet experience.

As of March 2018, Sugai has graduated from university. She was a member and then manager of the equestrian club.

Discography

Keyakizaka46

Sakamichi AKB

References

External links 

 Official Website (since February 12, 2023)
  (since January 11, 2022)
  (since November 24, 2022)

1995 births
Living people
Japanese actresses
Japanese female equestrians
Japanese idols
Keyakizaka46 members
Musicians from Tokyo
Sakurazaka46 members